Inlay on guitars or similar fretted instruments are decorative materials set into the wooden surface of the instrument using standard inlay techniques. Although inlay can be done on any part of a guitar, it is most commonly found on the fretboard, headstock—typically the manufacturer's logo—and around the sound hole of acoustic guitars. Only the positional markers on the fretboard or side of neck and the rosette around the sound hole serve any function other than decoration (the rosette serves as reinforcement). Nacre ("mother of pearl"), plastic and wood are the materials most often used as inlay.

Some very limited edition high-end or custom-made guitars have artistic inlay designs that span the entire front (or even the back) of the guitar. These designs use a variety of different materials and are created using techniques borrowed from furniture making.  While these designs are often just very elaborate decorations, they are sometimes works of art that even depict a particular theme or a scene. Although these guitars are often constructed from the most exclusive materials, they are generally considered to be collector's items and not intended to be played. Large guitar manufacturers often issue these guitars to celebrate a significant historical milestone.

Fretboard 

Some popular fretboard inlays include rhombuses, parallelograms, isosceles trapezoids, shark fins and rectangles. Circular markers are the easiest and least expensive to produce, because drilling circular indentations and cutting circular inlays (from sheets or rods) require the least time and resources. They are typically of a color contrasting with the color of the fretboard:  For example, whereas a luthier might use black for a light-colored fretboard such as maple, that same luthier would likely use white, silver, or mother-of-pearl for a fretboard made of a darker wood such as rosewood or ebony.

Many manufacturers use a distinct shape for their fret markers to create a brand identity set themselves apart from competitors. Gibson uses isosceles trapezoids while Fender uses dots, but others include lightning bolts, letters and numbers.

Smaller dots are also usually inlaid into the upper edge of the fretboard or the neck so as to be more visible to the player who views the instrument from the side.

LEDs or optical fiber can be employed to illuminate the markers. This is mostly employed by players who perform in front of live audiences where the lighting is either insufficient or constantly changing.

Schemes 

On guitars, there are two popular fretboard inlay schemes:

 A common position marker inlay scheme (1) involves single inlays on the 3rd, 5th, 7th, 9th, double inlays on the 12th, single inlays on the 15th, 17th, 19th, and 21st, and if present, double inlays on the 24th. Advantages of such scheme include its symmetry about the 12th fret and symmetry of every half (0–12 and 12–24) about the 7th and 19th frets. However, playing these frets, for example, on the E string would yield the notes E, G, A, B, C# that barely make a complete musical mode by themselves.

 Resonator Guitars usually have inlays like the first scheme shown above but with a single inlay on the 12th, and double inlays on the 15th.

 A less popular scheme (2) involves inlays on 3rd, 5th, 7th, 10th, 12th, 15th, 17th, 19th, 22nd and 24th frets. Playing these frets on the E string yields the notes E, G, A, B, D that fit perfectly into the E minor pentatonic scale. Such a scheme is very close to the coloring of a piano's keys and is in use on a few models of classical guitars, which often have fewer or no position markers.

Some guitars like the Gibson Les Paul Custom will also have a single inlay on the 1st fret, then follow one of the above schemes.

Headstock, neck and pickguard 

Beyond the fretboard inlay, the headstock and sound hole are also commonly inlaid. The manufacturer's logo is commonly inlaid into the headstock and pickguard, if present. Sometimes a small design such as a bird or other character or an abstract shape also accompanies the logo. The sound hole designs found on acoustic guitars vary from simple concentric circles to delicate fretwork. Many high-end guitars have more elaborate decorative inlay schemes. Often the edges of the guitar around the neck and body and down the middle of the back are inlaid.

Because some electric guitars (like the Fender Telecaster and Stratocaster) do not have a separate fretboard under which they can  fit a truss rod, they fit it in the back of the neck and cover it with a strip of dark wood. This has popularly become known as a "skunk stripe," and while it is not inlay, some makers use inlay to simulate it.

Sound hole 

The edge of the soundboard around the sound hole of an acoustic guitar is almost always decorated with a rosette inlay.

Main body

Many guitars also have inlays on the main guitar body itself, often for decorative purposes.

Binding 

Binding on acoustic guitars serve to protect the edges of the wood from impact and, particularly where end grain would be exposed, moisture damage. After the back, front and sides are joined a small ledge is cut out on the edge which is then inlaid before finishing the guitar. On solid-body electric guitars it serves only a cosmetic purpose. Fretboards are sometimes also "bound".

Purfling 

Purfling is similar to binding, but differs in that it is offset a small distance from the edge surface. It is typically found around the edges of the front, back and sound holes of violins. Purfling helps prevent cracks at the edge from extending deeper into the wood.

References 
 Examples and pictures of how inlay is done step-by-step.
 
 Guitar binding and purfling repair article on fretnotguitarrepair.com explains basic terms and lists common problems and solutions.
 Guitar Inlay Repair article that explains inlay materials, how inlays break, and how to repair guitar inlays on the Guitar Repair Bench Luthier Website

Guitar parts and accessories